The Schwalmis is a mountain of the Urner Alps, overlooking Lake Lucerne in Central Switzerland. Its  summit lies on the border between the cantons of Nidwalden and Uri.

References

External links
 Schwalmis on Hikr

Mountains of Switzerland
Mountains of the Alps
Mountains of the canton of Uri
Mountains of Nidwalden
Nidwalden–Uri border
Two-thousanders of Switzerland